Reinaldo Enrique Muñoz Pedroza (born 28 November 1971, Caracas) is a Venezuelan politician. He is the Attorney general of Venezuela and was appointed by President Nicolas Maduro.

In September 2020, Pedroza was sanctioned by the United States Department of Treasury. The U.S. accused Pedroza and three other Venezuelan nationals of undermining democracy and election interference in Venezuela.

References

1971 births
Living people
People from Caracas
Venezuelan politicians
Attorneys general of Venezuela
Specially Designated Nationals and Blocked Persons List